Actinopus paranensis is a species of mygalomorph spiders in the family Actinopodidae. It is found Argentina.

References

paranensis
Spiders described in 1920